The commedia sexy all'italiana (lit. "sex comedy Italian style"), also known as commedia scollacciata or commedia erotica all'italiana, is a subgenre of Italian commedia all'italiana film genre.

Style
Commedia sexy is characterized typically by both abundant female nudity and comedy, and by the minimal weight given to social criticism that was the basic ingredient of the main commedia all'italiana genre. Stories are often set in affluent environments such as wealthy households. It is closely connected to the sexual revolution, and it was something extremely new and innovative for that period. For the first time, films with female nudity could be watched at the cinema. Pornography and scenes of explicit sex were still forbidden in Italian cinemas, but partial nudity was somewhat tolerated. The genre has been described as a cross between bawdy comedy and humorous erotic film with ample slapstick elements which follows more or less clichéd storylines.

History

Roots
This subgenre has its roots in several different series of films. The "mondo film" genre popularized nudity, shifting the limits of what could be shown in the Italian cinema. A series of successful "commedia all'italiana" of the sixties (such as Pietro Germi's Signore & Signori (1966) and Dino Risi's Vedo nudo (1969)) focused on Italian hypocrisy and shame about sexual taboos, popularizing sex-based plots.

Main era
The commedia sexy was very successful commercially between the 1970s and early 1980s, although it was generally panned by critics (with a few exceptions such as several comedies starring Lando Buzzanca), and then declined when female nudity became common in Italian mainstream cinema, television and magazines, and when pornographic films became more widely available.

The decamerotici (1971–1975)
Pier Paolo Pasolini's Trilogy of Life (consisting of The Decameron (1971), Canterbury Tales (1972) and Arabian Nights (1974), and inspired by the tales of Giovanni Boccaccio's Decameron, Geoffrey Chaucer's The Canterbury Tales and the One Thousand and One Nights) contained nudity and sex-based plots. The success of these films and the relaxation of Italian censors, beginning from the early 1970s, paved the way for dozens of soft-core productions set in medieval or Renaissance times, collectively known as decamerotic (singular: decamerotico; alternative terms include decameronico and decamerone, as well as boccaccesco). The wave of decamerotici lasted from 1971 (starting with In Love, Every Pleasure Has Its Pain) until the end of 1975, with an early peak in 1972. In total, about 50 decamerotici were produced.

Subgenres

Other very popular subgenres of the "commedia sexy all'italiana" included high school, military, hospital, police and family comedies.

Actors
The commedia sexy launched the careers of several actresses, including Edwige Fenech, commonly considered the quintessential star of the genre; María Baxa and Gloria Guida, the staple lead actress of coming-of-age films and the popular La liceale series in the mid-1970s; and Nadia Cassini who was promoted as a successor to Fenech in the late 1970s. Many actresses who had gained earlier success in other genres moved to commedia sexy and became well-known within the genre, such as Femi Benussi in the mid-1970s and Barbara Bouchet in the late 1970s. The glamour models Anna Maria Rizzoli and Carmen Russo also followed this route in the early 1980s, a period when the genre was starting to fade in popularity. 

The genre is also identified with a number of prominent male comedians and actors including Lando Buzzanca, Lino Banfi, Carlo Giuffrè, Alberto Lionello, Pippo Franco, Alvaro Vitali, and Renzo Montagnani.

Selected filmography

 Four Times That Night (1971)
 The Naked Cello  (1971)
 Man of the Year  (1971)
 La bella Antonia, prima monica e poi dimonia (1972)
 The Eroticist (1972)
 Ubalda, All Naked and Warm (1972)
 Malicious (1973)
 Amarcord (1973)
 Giovannona Long-Thigh (1973)
 Lovers and Other Relatives (1974)
 Till Marriage Do Us Part (1974)
 La minorenne (1974)
 Monika (1974)
 Poker in Bed (1974)
 La sbandata (1974)
 Virilità (1974)
 Innocence and Desire (1974)
 Il gatto mammone (1975)
 Grazie... nonna (1975)
  The Teasers  (1975)
  La moglie vergine  (1975)
 La novizia (1975)
 Private Lessons (1975)
 That Malicious Age (Italian: Quella età maliziosa) (1975)
 The School Teacher  (1975)
 The Sensuous Nurse  (1975)
 Substitute Teacher (1975)
 L'affittacamere (1976)
 Confessions of a Lady Cop (1976)
 La professoressa di scienze naturali (1976)
 Il medico... la studentessa (1976)
 My Sister in Law (1976)
 Quel movimento che mi piace tanto (1976)
 Ragazza alla pari (1976)
 Scandalo in famiglia (1976)
 Sex with a Smile (1976)
 Sex with a Smile II (1976)
 Coeds (1976)
 La dottoressa del distretto militare (1976)
  La compagna di banco  (1977)
  Per amore di Poppea  (1977)
 The Schoolteacher Goes to Boys' High (1977)
 Taxi Girl (1977)
 The Virgo, the Taurus and the Capricorn (1977)
 La liceale nella classe dei ripetenti (1978)
 The School Teacher in the House (1978)
 Il corpo della ragassa (1979)
 Night Nurse (1979)
 L'insegnante balla... con tutta la classe (1979)
 How to Seduce Your Teacher (1979)
 La liceale, il diavolo e l'acquasanta (1979)
 A Policewoman on the Porno Squad (1979) 
 The Nurse in the Military Madhouse (1979)
 La dottoressa ci sta col colonnello (1980)
 L'insegnante al mare con tutta la classe (1980)
 La moglie in bianco... l'amante al pepe (1980)
 La moglie in vacanza... l'amante in città (1980)
 La ripetente fa l'occhietto al preside (1980)
 Cornetti alla crema (1981)
 Chaste and Pure (1981)
 Mia moglie torna a scuola (1981)
 L'onorevole con l'amante sotto il letto (1981)
 A Policewoman in New York (1981)
 There Is a Ghost in My Bed (1981)
 Giovani, belle... probabilmente ricche (1981)
 Ski Mistress (1981) 
 Spaghetti a mezzanotte (1981)

See also
 Mexican "sexicomedias", a similar genre in Mexican cinema that also peaked between the 1970s and 1980s.
 Nudity in film
 Pornochanchada, a Brazilian sex comedy genre
 Sex comedy
 Ilona Staller

References

Further reading
 Michele Giordano, Daniele Aramu, La commedia erotica italiana, Gremese Editore, 2000. .
 Max Serio, Commedia sexy all'italiana, Mediane, 2007. .
 Marco Bertolino, Ettore Ridola, Vizietti all'italiana: l'epoca d'oro della commedia sexy, I. Molino, 1999
 Gordiano Lupi, Le dive nude, Profondo rosso, 2006
 Gordiano Lupi, Grazie... zie! Tutto sulle attrici e i registi della commedia sexy all'italiana, Profondo rosso,  2012..
 Andrea Di Quarto, Michele Giordano, Moana e le altre, Gremese Editore, 1997
 Stefano Loparco, Il corpo dei Settanta. Il corpo, l'immagine e la maschera di Edwige Fenech, Il Foglio Letterario, 2009. .
 Giuliano Pavone, Giovannona Coscialunga a Cannes: storia e riabilitazione della commedia all'italiana anni '70'', Tarab, 1999

 
Italian films by genre

Commedia all'italiana
Film genres
Sex comedy
Sexuality and society